Many languages have distinct sets of enunciation and/or of writing, dependent on whether the speaker or writer be a man or a woman, and/or on whether the party or parties addressed be men or women.

Australia
Some tribes found in western Victoria prohibit a man and woman from marrying if they speak the same language. During initial visits in this arrangement, neither people are allowed the speak the dialect of the tribe that he or she is visiting.

Africa
The women in the Kaffir of South Africa have their own vocabulary system that is not understood by men. It is called the "ukulela kwabazi", or "women's language".

"the Suaheli have for every object which they do not care to mention by its real name a symbolic word understood by everybody concerned. In especial such symbols are used by women in their mysteries to denote obscene things. The words chosen are either ordinary names for innocent things or else taken from the old language or other Bantu languages, mostly Kiziguha, for among the Waziguha secret rites play an enormous role."

Europe
"There are families in which the wife talks Basque, while the husband does not even understand Basque and does not allow his children to learn it". 
"The old Livonian language, which is now nearly extinct, is kept up with the greatest fidelity by the women, while the men are abandoning it for Lettish."
"In France, about 1700, women were inclined to pronounce e instead of o ... . ... in the sixteenth century in France there was a tendency to leave off the trilling and even to go further than to the present English untrilled point r by pronouncing [z] instead, but some of the old grammarians mention this pronunciation as characteristic of women".

Asia
In the Sumerian group of dialects, "In addition to Main Dialect, there is also a sociolect called eme-sal. The meaning of the second element of the name is uncertain; it may mean "fine, thin". The "status" of this sociolect has been much discussed. It has traditionally been called a "women's language", because it appears in literary texts of the Old Babylonian period, used by goddesses when speaking to other goddesses. ... Emesal differs from Main Dialect in phonology and in lexicon, but not apparently in morphology. ... For example, words with /d/ in Main Dialect usually have /z/ in Emesal".

"emesal features actually appear in the speech of real women in the "Dialogues Between Two Women""

Other Eme-sal (language of women) to Eme-ku (language of men) phonemic correspondences are :
Eme-sal /m/, /b/, /d/ = Eme-ku /g/
Eme-sal /ê/ = Eme-ku /u/ {Cf. that for "the English sound system we have express statements by old grammarians that women had a more advanced pronunciation than men, and characteristically enough these statements refer to the raising of the vowels in the direction of [i]".}
Eme-sal /š/ = Eme-ku /z/
Eme-sal /l/ = Eme-ku /n/

In eastern Siberia, "Chukchi women's language differs from the Chukchi men's variety in a number of synchronically unpredictable ways, particularly with respect to an alternation between r and c/č. ... this alternation is nonarbitrary, originating from the asymmetric collapse of three cognate sets into two, such that in men's Chukchi *r and *d > r and *c > č, whereas in women's Chukchi *r > r and *d and *c > c."

Pacific Islands
In the Sandwich Islands, "the women engaged in the beating had a system of signalling by blows and intervals from valley to valley. This is a very primitive kind of telegraphy".

The Americas
"The robes of buffalo hide on which a great deal of picture writing was done were all wrought by women, and ... among the Plains Indians the women have a picture language unknown to the men."

"the earliest observation of a difference between the language of men and that of women was apparently that of Raymond Breton ... in Guadéloupe and Dominica.  ... it seems that the island Carib have two distinct vocabularies, and used by men and by women when speaking to men, and the other used by women when speaking to each other, and by men when repeating in oratio obliqua some saying of the women. ... 
In the language of the Abipones some words varied according to sex."
"Of the Guaycurus of the Gran Chaco ... "... the speech of the men is wholly, or at least in certain words, different from that of the men." The Karaya have a special women’s dialect ... . 
The Eskimo women of the Mackenzie Delta have a special expressions, words, and terminations which the men do not use."

In the Lesser Antilles, "words special to one or the other sex are found most frequently in the names of the various degrees of kinship ; thus, ... for maternal uncle, son (elder son, younger son), brother-in-law, wife, mother, grandmother, daughter, cousin all of these are different according as a man or a woman is speaking. It is the same with the names of some though far from all, of the different parts of the body".
"With the Chiquitos in Bolivia, ... men indicate by the addition of -tii that a male person is spoken about, while the women do not use this suffix and thus make no distinction between ' he ' and ' she,' ' his ' and ' her.' ... To many substantives the men prefix a vowel which the women do not employ. {Cf. the difference between Yoruba of Nigeria and Fǫn of Dahomey, in that Yoruba prefixes to many substantives a vowel which Fǫn does not employ.}

"Similar gender-associated languages" include Yanomama.

See also
Nü shu

Notes

References
Ernst Crawley : Mystic Rose : A Study of Primitive Marriage and of Primitive Thought in Its Bearing on Marriage. 1927.
Otto Jespersen : Language : Its Nature, Development and Origin. London : George Allen & Unwin, 1922. 
Otis Tufton Mason : Women’s Share in Primitive Culture. New York : D. Appleton & Company, 1899.

Language varieties and styles
Sociolinguistics